Vanuatu competed in the Commonwealth Games for the sixth time, once again failing to win any medals. The country was represented by three athletes (Moses Kamut, Robert Nidithawaea and Jimmy Sandy), who all competed in track athletics events. Sandy was Vanuatu's flagbearer during the Games' opening ceremony.

Medals

See also
2002 Commonwealth Games results

References

2002
2002 in Vanuatuan sport
Nations at the 2002 Commonwealth Games